Zambia participated for the first time at the Olympic Games under the current name in 1968, and has since taken part in every Summer Olympic Games with the exception of 1976. Previously, it competed as Northern Rhodesia in 1964 and under the banner of Rhodesia in 1960. Zambia has never sent athletes to compete in the Winter Olympic Games. 

Zambian athletes have won two medals in two sports. Boxer Keith Mwila won the country's first Olympic medal, a bronze, in the light flyweight category at the 1984 Summer Olympics, and twelve years later, Samuel Matete secured the silver medal in the men's 400 metres hurdles.

The National Olympic Committee of Zambia (NOCZ) was created in 1951 and recognised by the International Olympic Committee in 1963.

Medal tables

Medals by Games

Medals by sport

List of medalists

See also
 Zambia at the Paralympics
 List of flag bearers for Zambia at the Olympics

References

External links
 
 
 
  

 
Olympics